John William Summers (April 29, 1870 – September 25, 1937) was an American physician and politician who served seven terms as a U.S. Representative from Washington from 1919 to 1933.

Early life and education 

Born in Valeene, Indiana, Summers attended the public schools. He was graduated from the Southern Indiana Normal College at Mitchell, Indiana, in 1889 and from the Kentucky School of Medicine at Louisville in 1892. He pursued postgraduate studies in the Louisville Medical College and in New York, London, Berlin, and the University of Vienna, Austria.

Medical career 
He commenced the practice of medicine in Mattoon, Illinois. He moved to Walla Walla, Washington, in 1908 and continued the practice of medicine. He also engaged in agricultural pursuits and fruit raising.

Congress 
He served as member of the State house of representatives in 1917. Summers was elected as a Republican to the Sixty-sixth and to the six succeeding Congresses (March 4, 1919 – March 3, 1933). He was an unsuccessful candidate for reelection in 1932 to the Seventy-third Congress, and for election in 1934 to the Seventy-fourth Congress and in 1936 to the Seventy-fifth Congress.

Later career and death 
He resumed former pursuits. Summers was married to  Jennie ( Burks) Summers (1867–1956), a member of the Christian Women's Temperance Union, as well as active member of many club, church and organizational groups.

Summers died in Walla Walla, Washington on September 25, 1937. He was interred in Mountain View Cemetery, alongside his wife, Jennie.

Family 
Summers' daughter, Hope, was a film and television actress, best remembered by TV audiences on TV's on The Andy Griffith Show and Mayberry R.F.D., as Aunt Bee's gossipy best friend Clara Edwards (1960–71).

Sources

1870 births
1937 deaths
Politicians from Walla Walla, Washington
Republican Party members of the Washington House of Representatives
Physicians from Illinois
Republican Party members of the United States House of Representatives from Washington (state)
People from Mitchell, Indiana